Antonio Beltrami (1724–1784) was an Italian painter active in the late-Baroque and Neoclassic periods. He was born in Cremona. He was a pupil of Francesco Boccaccino, who emerged from the school of Carlo Maratta. His older brother, Giovanni Battista was an engraver.

Antonio painted at age 16 for the church of the Observant Minorites of San'Angelo in Cremona a canvas of Saints of the Franciscan order.  He traveled to the royal court in Vienna to perform portraits and decorate maps.

References

1724 births
1784 deaths
18th-century Italian painters
Italian male painters
Painters from Cremona
Italian Baroque painters
Pupils of Carlo Maratta
18th-century Italian male artists